Symphony No. 1 "Polyphonic" is the first symphony by Estonian composer Arvo Pärt. The symphony was written in 1963. It is dedicated to Estonian composer Heino Eller.

The symphony has two main parts: canons and prelude plus fuga.

Recordings
 Arvo Pärt, BIS (1989); Bamberg Symphony Orchestra, conductor Neeme Järvi
 Searching for roots, Virgin Classics (1997); Royal Stockholm Philharmonic Orchestra, conductor Paavo Järvi
 Pro & contra. Arvo Pärt, Virgin classics (2004); Estonian National Symphony Orchestra, conductor Paavo Järvi
 The Sound of Arvo Pärt, Parlophone, Warner (2015); Estonian National Symphony Orchestra, conductor Paavo Järvi
 Arvo Pärt. The Symphonies, ECM (2018); Wrocław NFM Philharmonic Orchestra, conductor Tõnu Kaljuste

References

Symphonies by Arvo Pärt
1963 compositions
Part